Mania is an EP of song covers by American rock band New Found Glory, released on April 29, 2013 on vinyl for Record Store Day. The EP consists of 6 covers originally performed by The Ramones. It was released digitally one week after RSD.

This EP is the last New Found Glory record to feature guitarist Steve Klein who parted ways with the band in December 2013.

Track listing

Personnel
New Found Glory
 Jordan Pundik — lead vocals
 Chad Gilbert — lead guitar, backing vocals
 Steve Klein — rhythm guitar
 Ian Grushka — bass
 Cyrus Bolooki — drums, percussion

References

External links

Mania at YouTube (streamed copy where licensed)

Covers EPs
2013 EPs
Bridge 9 Records EPs
Ramones tribute albums